Microsoft Content Management Server (MCMS) is a discontinued Microsoft product intended for small to medium enterprises that require content management functionality on their web site, intranet or portal.

History 
Microsoft Content Management Server was originally developed by a Canadian software company named NCompass Labs Inc. It was first marketed as ActiveEnterprise in 1997 and later changed its name to NCompass Resolution. In 2001 NCompass Labs was purchased by Microsoft for $36 million dollars and the product was re-released under MCMS branding.

MCMS 2002

Some of the features offered by this product:

 Inline content-editing
 Built-in security model for authors, editors, moderators, template designers, channel managers, and administrators
 Integrates with Visual Studio, Visual Studio .NET 2003 and Visual Studio 2005
 Some out-of-the-box placeholders (which are essentially editable portions of a page)
 Support for multi-language content through parallel channel an connected posting
 Customizable workflow

Discontinuation

The web content management capabilities of MCMS 2002 were integrated into Microsoft Office SharePoint Server 2007. New functionality such as Enterprise Content Management, Business Intelligence, and search has also been included. Mainstream support ended 14 April 2009, and extended support ended 8 April 2014.

External links
 http://www.microsoft.com/cmserver/default.mspx
 http://download.microsoft.com/download/4/2/5/4250f79a-c3a1-4003-9272-2404e92bb76a/MCMS+2002+-+(complete)+FAQ.htm
 http://blogs.technet.com/b/stefan_gossner/archive/tags/mcms/

Literature
 Building Websites with Microsoft Content Management Server
 Advanced Microsoft Content Management Server Development
 Enhancing Microsoft Content Management Server with ASP.NET

References

Microsoft server technology
Content management systems